Insoportablemente Vivo is the seventh album and the second live album by the rock band La Renga. It was recorded at the Huracán Athletic Club stadium on May 19, 2001. It has two unedited songs: Un Tiempo Fuera De Casa and Oportunidad Oportuna. It achieved 2× platinum status in Argentina for sales in excess of 80,000 copies.

A live DVD was released in 2004. A movie was made of the Huracán concert and also shows moments of the band's history.

Track listing
All songs by Gustavo Napoli except Hey, Hey, My, My (Neil Young):

Disc 1:
 "Panic Show"
 "Motoralmaisangre"
 "Al Que He Sangrado"
 "Bien Alto"
 "Cuando Vendrán"
 "En El Baldío"
 "El Mambo de la Botella"
 "Blues Cardíaco"
 "El Terco"
 "En Pie"
 "El Cielo del Desengaño"
 "Lo Frágil de la Locura"
 "Un Tiempo Fuera de Casa"
 "La Vida, Las Mismas Calles"
 "El Twist del Pibe"
 "El Hombre de la Estrella"

Disc 2:
 "Paja Brava"
 "Oportunidad Oportuna"
 "2+2=3"
 "Arte Infernal"
 "El Circo Romano"
 "Cuando Estés Acá"
 "La Balada del Diablo y La Muerte"
 "El Rey de la Triste Felicidad"
 "El Final Es En Donde Partí"
 "Me Hice Canción"
 "Pcilocybe Mexicana"
 "El Revelde"
 "Estalla"
 "Hey Hey, My My"
 "Hablando de la Libertad"

Personnel
Chizzo - lead vocals, lead guitar
Tete - bass guitar
Tanque - drums
Chiflo - saxophone, trumpet
Manu - saxophone, harmonica, quena, rhythm guitar, backing vocals

Guest musicians
Pablo Martinián - keyboards (tracks 6 and 11, disc 1; 3 and 4, disc 2)
Ricardo Mollo - guitar (track 10, disc 1)
Pappo - guitar (track 14, disc 2)
Juan Cruz Fernández - wind instruments (tracks 8 and 9, disc 1)
Leopoldo Janín - wind instruments (tracks 8 and 9, disc 1)

Additional personnel
Gustavo Borner - recording technician, mixing, mastering
Gabriel Goncalvez - manager
Alejandro Vasquez - A&R

References

2001 live albums
La Renga albums
Live albums recorded in Buenos Aires